The International Federation of Employees in Public Service (INFEDOP) was an International Trade Federation of the World Confederation of Labour (WCL).

History
The federation was founded in November 1953, when the International Federation of Christian Post, Telegraph and Telephone Workers merged with the International Federation of Christian Trade Unions, at a meeting in Paris.  Initially named the International Federation of Christian Staff Unions, Utilities and Post, Telegraph and Telephone Workers, it adopted its final name in 1966.

In 1963, the federation founded a section for teachers' unions, which in 1974 split away as the independent World Confederation of Teachers.

By 1979, INFEDOP claimed that its affiliates had a total of 3,500,000 members.

Leadership

General Secretaries
Jacques Tessier
Jos Vandecruys
1980s: Bert Van Caelenberg

Presidents
Paul Seiler

Filip Wieers
Fritz Neugebauer

References

External links
www.cmt-wcl.org, detail from the WCL website.

 
Trade unions established in 1953